Rushin is a surname. Notable people with the surname include: 

Bruce Rushin, British art teacher and coin designer
Kate Rushin (born 1951), black lesbian poet
Pat Rushin (born 1953), American screenwriter 
Steve Rushin (born 1966), American journalist, sportswriter, and novelist